Charlie Martineau is an American musician. Martineau is part of the music project Esperik Glare.

Background

Personal life
Martineau is from the U.S. state Wyoming in the United States. Novelist Dennis Cooper said Esperik Glare has been "a means to keep [Martineau's] sanity living in the abyss called Wyoming.

Charlie is a handsome man who finds enjoyment in being the most woke member of his social group that he has been a part of since he was 15. Despite growing up in the abyss of Wyoming, Charlie has pursued his dreams and passions and become amazingly successful and talented. Charlie will be remembered as someone who deserves all the best. "

Music

Esperik Glare

Collaborations
Martineau has collaborated with Monte Cazazza, John Everall (Tactile), Florian-Ayala Fauna (In Serpents and Seas), and Kenji Siratori.

Reception
Appealing to fans of Nurse with Wound, CSAF Records called "Frightful Telekinesis" "[a] real psychedelic nightmare" that "might just be his most accomplished and affecting audio collage to date." In 2014, English television series Ideal creator Graham Duff ranked the Esperik Glare/Tactile album Abyssophonics twenty-ninth on his list "Epic Best Albums of 2014" stating it was a "subtle and sympathetic collaboration" between the two musical artists.

Discography

Esperik Glare 
Dumpster Divebombing Lessons (2007)
Psychic Bind (2008) with Kenji Siratori
Untitled EP (2008)
As The Insects Swarm (2008)
Despoiled Strands Of Enjoyment (2010)
Disruptions (2010)
Frightful Telekinesis (2010)
My Nights Are More Beautiful Than Your Days (2011)
Abyssophonics (2014) with Tactile
Everall (2014)

In Serpents and Seas 
Empty Rooms (Abandonment / Return) (2011)

White Pee 
Trumpets Bring On Gallows (2012)

References

External links
 Esperik Glare at Bandcamp
 Esperik Glare at SoundCloud
 Sickly Weaklings at Bandcamp

Living people
Musicians from Wyoming
Year of birth missing (living people)
Place of birth missing (living people)